The Battle of Rakvere took place March 5, 1603 during the Polish–Swedish War (1600–1611).
In December, 1602, the siege of Dorpat commenced.  On 5 March 1603 at Rakvere with 1,000 men Jan Chodkiewicz defeated the Swedish relief force of 2,000 and on 13 April Dorpat capitulated. 
In the battle the Lithuanians lost only one soldier, and two were wounded. The Swedes lost 70 Germans mercenaries and 100 Estonian peasants.

References 
 Leszek Podhorodecki, "Rapier i koncerz", Warszawa 1985, 
 Polish Renaissance Warfare: Swedish Polish War 1600 to 1609, Military Operations, from late 1601 to 1604, http://www.jasinski.co.uk/wojna/battles/1600-Sw/1600-Sw-06.htm

Rakvere 1603
Rakvere 1603
Rakvere 1603
Rakvere
Rakvere 1603
1603 in Europe
17th century in Estonia